William Arthur Wilson (17 March 1896 – 1996) was an English professional footballer who played in the Football League for Merthyr Town as a right half.

Personal life 
Wilson served as a chief petty officer in the Royal Navy during the First World War. He served at HMS Vivid II in Devonport.

References 

English footballers
English Football League players
Place of death missing
Association football wing halves
Durham Light Infantry soldiers
1896 births
1996 deaths
Newcastle United F.C. players
Merthyr Town F.C. players
West Stanley F.C. players
Carlisle United F.C. players
Footballers from Newcastle upon Tyne
Military personnel from Newcastle upon Tyne
Royal Navy personnel of World War I